Joseph Suder (12 December 1892 – 13 September 1980) was a German composer. His opera Kleider machen Leute was composed 1926–34 but not performed until 1964.

References

1892 births
1980 deaths